Bear Mountain is a mountain located in the Siskiyou Mountains of Northern California in the United States. The highest point in Del Norte County is located just west of the summit at about 6404+ feet (1952+ meters). The mountain is in the Siskiyou Wilderness and straddles the county boundary, which also separates the Six Rivers and Klamath national forests.
A cirque named Devils Punchbowl containing a tarn is located on the mountain's north side.
Due to its location near the Pacific Ocean, the mountain normally receives tremendous snowfall during the winter.

References

External links

Klamath Mountains
Klamath National Forest
Mountains of Del Norte County, California
Mountains of Siskiyou County, California
Six Rivers National Forest
Mountains of Northern California